Ciudad Residencial Tiempo Libre is a residential complex in Marbella, Spain. Built by the Cultural Interest movement, it was designed with one hundred ninety-nine homes and buildings. The project organizes residential areas, which include clubs and restaurants, a reception building, church, health center, shopping center, housing director, and workshop-garage, sports areas, areas dedicated to services and housing staff, and others dedicated to parks and gardens.

References
The content of this article incorporates text from the statement Cultural Interest published in the BOJA No. 200, October 16, 2006 (text), which is in the public domain pursuant to the provisions of Article 13 of the Spanish Intellectual Property Law.

Buildings and structures in Marbella